Dr. Haldhar Nag (born 31 March 1950) is a Sambalpuri poet and writer from Bargarh, Odisha, India. Popularly known as "Lok kabi Ratna". He was awarded Padma Shri, the fourth highest civilian award of India by Government of India in 2016. He was born in a poor family of Ghens. He is best known for his work Kavyanjali, an anthology of English translation of Nag's selected poetry which was launched on 2 October 2016. Recently he released his 3rd volume of work on Kavyanjali. In 2019 Haldhar Nag was awarded Doctorate Degree by Sambalpur University. In the year 2020, Professor Jaishankar Babu, Head of the Department of Hindi, Pondicherry University, organized a two-day international seminar under the guidance of its Vice-Chancellor Professor Gurmeet Singh, in which "Haldhar Nag Ka kavya- Sansar" translated into Hindi from Sambalpuri by renowned Hindi writer-cum-transaltor  Dinesh Kumar Mali was released and there was an intensive discussion on his poems by the participants from India and abroad. In the year 2021, under joint editorship  Professor Jaishankar Babu and translator Dinesh Kumar Mali, the book "'Haldhar ke Lok-sahitya par vimarsh'" and the book "Ramayan prasangon par Haldhar ke Kavya aur yugin Vimarsh " translated by Dinesh Kumar Mali based on Ramayana contexts. published from Pandulipi  Prakashan, New Delhi.The popularity of these books Hindi Belt honored Haldhar Nag with Dr. Ram Manohar Tripathi Lok Seva Samman on the Silver Jubilee eve of Acharya Mahavir Prasad Dwivedi Smruti Sanrakshan Abhiyan under the leadership of Gaurav Awasthi in the auditorium of Firoz Gandhi College, Rae Bareli on date 12.11.22. The Indira Gandhi National Open University (IGNOU) has included a review of literary creations of Padma awardee and noted poet Haldhar Nag.
According to sources, students pursuing a Master of Arts (MA) in Folklore and Culture Studies will study folk literature by Nag in a course component titled, ‘Folklore: Canon, Multimediality, Interdisciplinarity, and Social Epistemology’ in their second year.The course book has described Nag as the true representative of orality in the present times. His creations have been reviewed in the category, ‘Case study of orality from East India’.“Nag has based his poems on his surroundings. Folklorists and folklore researchers are vulnerable to multiple challenges with regards to archiving, documentation, and dissemination of the folk material,” TOI reported writer Nandini Sahu, who has designed the MA course for IGNOU, as saying.Notably, writer Dinesh K Mali has written a chapter for the MA programme on Nag’s poetry.'

Sambalpur University is coming up with a compilation of his writings — Haldhar Granthabali-2 — which will be a part of its syllabus.

Early life

He was born in a poor family of Ghens in Bargarh district of Odisha. At a very small age, he lost his only financially capable father due to which he had to do work for his family. He had to drop his school when he was studying in class 3. He had to work as a local dishwasher in a sweetmeat shop to feed his family, realizing his condition village head took him to high-school and there he worked as a cook for more than 10 years. He also opened a small stationery shop nearby the school, that too by taking a loan of ₨ 1000.

Though he is a awardee of Padma Shree which is of the highest award in India, he lives a simple life with just a shop and hawker, as his main source of income. He also sells Raag Chanaa (Indian snacks, especially in Western Odisha) in street.

Literary career
He has been compared to Gangadhar Meher for his Sambalpuri style of writing. The BBC made a documentary film about his life and works.
Dhodo Bargachh (The Old Banyan Tree) was published in a local magazine, which was one of his first Poem. His literary works mostly include a fighter in his own right, social reformation through protecting human dignity. 
According to thehindu he was very encouraged by the people who liked his literary work in Sambalpuri style, he said:-
"I was felicitated and that encouraged me to write more," 
 -Lok Kabi Ratna.

He is also known for his prolific memory, he can recall all his poems he had written till his last poetry known to people.
He again recalls us, what he believes that....

A man of simple needs, "Poetry must have real-life connection and a message for the people."

His poetry is now considered as a subject of research by five doctoral scholars. Sambalpur University has also compiled his works in a book called Haldar Granthabali-2. In the year 2017, he also received the Padma Shri, India's fourth highest civilian award, from The 13th President of India Pranab Mukherjee for his contribution to Sambalpuri language.

Literary Style
His poetry is based on the issues of daily life such as social issues, nature, religion and fighting oppression.

Works
Some of his works which is still most favoured are:-
 Lokgeet
 Samparda
 Krushnaguru
 Mahasati Urmila
 Tara Mandodari
 Achhia
 Bacchhar
 Siri Somalai
 Veer Surendra Sai
 Karamsani
 Rasia Kavi (biography of Tulasidas)
 Prem Paechan
3rd volume of Kavyanjali (released on 22 November 2019)

In addition, he has also acted in two Sambalpuri films, namely Sahamate Maa Samalei and Maa Budhi Kamgei Kathani.

Social media

Advertising filmmaker and documentary director Bharatbala who aimed to produce 1,000 short films under the banner Virtual Bharat to chronicle the untold stories and where the famous litterateur and film director Sampooran Singh Kalra also known by Gulzar narrated Haldhar nag.

His narration in this short film begins with "I am writing a letter to you Haldhar. Son of the soil of Sambalpur, this Adivasi poet. His language is Sambalpuri."

As part of the series, Gulzar narrated a brief summary about Nag in the appropriately 8 minute long story, in Virtual Bharat which is a collection of short stories about country India in various fields. Gulzar as a token of gift send him ₹50,000.

Research centre
Government of Odisha recently announced that Sambalpuri language and literature research centre at Ghens village in Bargarh district will be established soon under his name.

See also
 Odia language
 Odia literature
 List of Indian poets

References

External links 

 Sambalpuri language
 
 
 

1950 births
Living people
Indian male poets
People from Bargarh district
Recipients of the Padma Shri in literature & education
Epic poets
Adivasi writers
Poets from Odisha
20th-century Indian poets
21st-century Indian poets